The 1970 Ireland rugby union tour of Argentina was a series of matches played between August and September in Argentina by the Ireland national rugby union team.

Despite that the matches were not officially recognised by the Irish Rugby Football Union as Test matches, it was a real tour of Irish national team.  At that time, the IRFU considered as official only matches against the other Home Unions, Australia, South Africa and New Zealand. It was the third tour of a "Home Union" in Argentina in three years, after Wales (1968) and Scotland (1969), and it was the second tour of an Irish side after the tour of 1952.

Argentina won the unofficial series with two victories.

Touring party

 Manager: E. Patterson
 Assistant Manager: Ronnie Dawson
 Captain: Tom Kiernan

Backs
 Barry Bresnihan (London Irish)
 William Brown (Malone)
 Alan Duggan (Lansdowne)
 Tom Grace (University College Dublin)
 L. Hall (Garryowen)
 Tom Kiernan (Cork Constitution)
 Barry McGann (Cork Constitution)
 John Moloney (St Mary's College)
 H. Murphy (University College Dublin)
 Barry O'Driscoll (Manchester)
 Frank O'Driscoll (University College Dublin)

Forwards
 J. Birch (Ballymena)
 James Buckley (Sunday's Well)
 P. Cassidy (Corinthians)
 Mick Hipwell (Terenure College)
 Ronnie Lamont (Instonians)
 Sean Lynch (St Mary's College)
 Willie John McBride (Ballymena)
 P. Madigan (Old Belvedere)
 Syd Millar (Ballymena)
 Mick Molloy (London Irish)
 Terry Moore (Highfield)
 Phil O'Callaghan (Dolphin)

Match details 
Complete list of matches played by Ireland in Argentina:

Seleccionado del Interior: L. Capell; D. Filippa, R. Tarquini, G. Vera, M. Brandi; C. Navessi, L.
Chacón; B. Casalle, J. Ghiringhelli, H. Barrera; R. Pasaglia, R. Campra (cap.); G. Ribeca, L. Ramos
(C. Bianchi), M. Senatore (C. Abud)
Ireland: T. Ciernan; A. Duggan, F. Brenishan, R. Murphy, W. Brown; B. Mc Gann, J. Molones; J.
Buckley, A. Moore, R. Lamont; M. Mohillo, W. Mac Bride; P. O ́Callagham, J. Lynch. 

 Rosario: J. Seaton; R. Villavicencio, J. Benzi, C. Blanco, C. García; J. Scilabra, M. Escalante; J. L. Imhoff, M. Chesta (cap.), J. Robin; M. Bouza, J. Mangiamelli; R. Fariello, J. Costante, F. Landó.
Ireland: B. O ́Driscoll; A. Duggan, F. Brenishan, F. O ́Driscoll, T. Grace; B. Mc Gann, L. Hall; R. Lamont, A. Moore, M. Hipwell; W. Mc Bride (cap.), P. Cassidy; S. Millar, J. Brich, J. Lynch. 

 Argentina B: J. Seaton; N. Pérez, J. Benzi, C. Blanco, J. Otaola; T. Harris-Smith, A. Etchegaray (cap.); N. Carbone, G. Anderson, R. Casabal; J. Retegui, R. Castro; M. Farna, J. Dumas, A. Abella.
Ireland: T. Ciernan (cap.); A. Duggan, F. O ́Driscoll, F. Brenishan, W. Brown; B. Mc Gann, J.
Molones; M. Hipwell, A. Moore, J. Buckley; M. Mohillo, W. Mc Bride; S. Millar, J. Birch, P. O ́Callaghan. 

 Argentina D: A. Bollini; P. Kember, E. Reynolds, L. Esteras, A. Stein; F. Forrester, G. Blaksley
(cap.); C. Bori, E. Elowson, J. Borghi; J. C. Anderson, J. Vorasoro; F. Insúa, G. Casas, E. Merelle.
Ireland: T. Ciernan (cap.); A. Duggan, F. O ́Driscoll, B. O ́Driscoll, W. Brown; H. Murphy, L. Hall; R. Lamont, M. Hipwell, J. Buckley; P. Cassidy, M. Mohillo; J. Lynch, P. Madigan, P. O ́Callaghan.

First test 

 Argentina C: R. Espagnol; H. Rosatti, J. Walther (E. Word), E. Pérez Otero (G. Blaksley); G. Pimentel, M. Cutler; J. Carracedo, J. Wittman, M. Morgan; A. Orzábal, F. Hughes; H. Incola, L. Lebrón, O. Carbone.
Ireland: B. O ́Driscoll; T. Grace, F. Brenishan, H. Murphy, W. Brown (J. Maloney); F. O ́Driscoll, L. Hall; R. Lamont, M. Hipwell, J. Buckley; P. Cassidy, W. Mc Bride (cap.); J. Lynch, P. Madigan, S.  Millar.

Second test

Notes

References 

1970
1970
1970 rugby union tours
1970 in Argentine sport
Rugby union tour
History of rugby union matches between Argentina and Ireland
1970–71 in Irish rugby union